Tandem C2 domains nuclear protein is a protein that in humans is encoded by the TC2N gene.

References

Further reading